is a branch of the Kobayashi Shorin-ryū style of Okinawan Karate, developed by Shūgorō Nakazato, Hanshi 10th Dan. Nakazato was a student of Choshin Chibana. After Chibana's death in 1969, Nakazato assumed the title of Vice President of the Okinawa Shorin-Ryū Karate-do Association. In November 1975, Nakazato resigned from this association and formed the Okinawa Karate-do Shorin-Ryū Shorinkan Association.

In the United States the senior teachers are Noel Smith (8th dan) and Eddie Bethea.  Both Mr. Smith and Mr. Bethea trained directly under Sensei Shugoro Nakazato in the early 1960s, both have firsthand knowledge and exposure to his teachings, philosophies and concepts of karate. In the early years seven of Shugoro Nakazato's black belts returned to the US to spread Okinawan Shorin-ryu to the States; they are referred to as the Original 7.

North America SHORINKAN Lineage 
This Lineage chart only reflects the Original 7 Black Belts from Shugoro Nakzato and their Kyoshis: Tadashi Yamashita, Nabil Noujaim, Eddie Bethea, Pat Haley, Noel Smith, C.D. Williamson, Neil Stolsmark, Sean Riley, Sam Ahtye, David Rogers, Robert Rowley, Claude Johnson, and Harunobu Chiba.

References

External links
 United States Shorin-ryu Shorinkan website (Official North American Website.  Senior North American Kyoshi Noel Smith
 Shorinkan

Karate organizations
Shōrin-ryū